Delpontia is a genus of fungi within the family Stictidaceae. It is a monotypic genus, containing the single species Delpontia pulchella.

The genus name of Delpontia is in honour of Giovanni Battista Delponte (1812-1884), who was an Italian botanist and Professor of Botany in Turin.

The genus was circumscribed by Albert Julius Otto Penzig and Pier Andrea Saccardo in Malpighia Vol.15 on page 220 in 1901.

References

Taxa described in 1902
Ostropales
Lichen genera
Ostropales genera
Taxa named by Pier Andrea Saccardo
Taxa named by Albert Julius Otto Penzig